The Confederation of Swiss Employees' Associations (VSA) was a national trade union federation bringing together unions representing non-manual workers in Switzerland.

History
The federation was established in 1918 by most of the country's trade unions for non-manual workers.  These included the Swiss Craftsmen's Association, the Union Helvetia, and the Swiss Association of Technicians, but more than half the membership came from the Swiss Commercial Association.  The new federation remained riven with disputes, with many of the smaller affiliates wanting to merge into a single union, but the large affiliates preferring to retain their independence.  The Technicians resigned in 1922, and in 1935 a dispute over co-operation between the VSA and the Swiss Trade Union Federation led the Association of Swiss Employees' Associations of the Machine Industry to resign.

Despite the disputes, membership of the federation trended up, from 60,000 in 1940, to peak at 148,734 in 1985.  In the 1960s, it began admitting unions representing any workers.  However, from the late-1980s, it began losing members, and was down to 120,950 in seven unions by 1997.  In 2000, the Swiss Commercial Association resigned, leaving the VSA much weakened.  In 2002, it merged with the Christian National Union Confederation, to form Travail.Suisse.

Affiliates

References

Trade unions in Switzerland
Trade unions established in 1918
Trade unions disestablished in 2002